Ma Su (190–228), courtesy name Youchang, was a military general and strategist of the state of Shu Han in the Three Kingdoms period of China. Ma Su had conspicuous talent in military theories and was admired by the Shu chancellor Zhuge Liang. However, a tactical blunder by Ma Su at the Battle of Jieting resulted in Shu being dealt a huge defeat by Zhang He, a general of the rival state of Wei. He was a younger brother of Ma Liang.

Much dramatisation shrouds the death of Ma Su. According to the biography of Ma Su's close friend Xiang Lang, Ma Su was said to have attempted to flee with no further information if it was after or during his defeat at Jieting, but was captured. Following this, he was executed on Zhuge Liang's order and seemed to have face death with dignity. Most of the cultural's depictions concentrate on the latter part such as the historical novel Romance of the Three Kingdoms as well as the Peking opera Loss of Jieting.

Early life
A local of Yicheng, Xiangyang (present-day Yicheng, Hubei), Ma Su was one of the five brothers in the family, all of whom were renowned for their intellects and commonly known as the "Five Changs" as their style names all contained "Chang". Though Ma Su's elder brother Ma Liang was deemed to be the most talented among them all. Together with Ma Liang, Ma Su began his service under Liu Bei around 205, when Liu Bei was still a guest of Liu Biao in Jing Province (covering present-day Hubei and Hunan). In 214, when Liu Bei started his campaign against Liu Zhang into Yi Province, Ma Su followed him with the army and served as a military advisor along with Pang Tong and Fa Zheng. To reward him for his help during the campaign; Liu Bei after his victory named him not only as the Prefect of Mianzhu, but also Chengdu the capital of the recently conquered province.

Since the start, Ma Su had talent and ability that surpassed others and enjoyed discussing planning and strategy. Liu Bei's chief advisor Zhuge Liang had been impressed by Ma Su's expansive knowledge in military strategy. At some point before 219, Ma Su was transferred to Yuexi, a troubled commandery in the south as his Administrator. Yuexi was home to numerous indigenous tribes, many of whom refused to accept Liu Bei’s authority. It was the site of a significant tribal revolt led by Gao Ding (高定), the chief of the Sou tribe (叟族) in 218. With help from Li Yan who bent Gao Ding in battle; Ma Su did well in keeping order in the commandery. However, before Liu Bei died in 223, he warned Zhuge Liang that Ma Su's knowledge and speech exceed his real abilities and should not be given important appointments. Still, Zhuge Liang did not heed the warning, and Ma Su was made a personal military consultant to Zhuge soon after Liu died. The two were very close and would often hold discussions from dawn to dusk.

Southern Campaign

During the campaign against Meng Huo, Ma Su went several tens of li to see Zhuge Liang off. Zhuge Liang told Ma Su: "It's been years since we strategized together, now I ask for your help with your wise and skilled planning."

Ma Su answered to Zhuge Liang as such:  Zhuge Liang was greatly impressed and followed Ma Su's advice, many times he forgave Meng Huo in order to gain the trust of the people of the South. And so, until the end of Zhuge Liang’s life, the South did not rebel again.

Performance in Jieting

In 228, Zhuge Liang launched his Northern Expeditions against Wei, at the time there were veteran leaders such as Wei Yan and Wu Yi. Among the army, many suggested appointing either one of them as the vanguard commander however Zhuge Liang disagreed with the majority and chose the callow Ma Su to command the army at the front instead.

Ma Su's forces encountered Zhang He's forces at Jieting. It was here that Ma Su made a serious tactical blunder. He had camped on top of a hill, believing the vantage point would provide him with a more advantageous position in terms of observation and a place of attack. The veteran general Wang Ping advised against Ma Su's decision, arguing that their water supply might be cut off and their forces surrounded. While his good counsel was rejected, Ma Su allowed Wang Ping to take 1,000 men and camp nearby the source of the Shu forces' water supply.

As Wang Ping predicted, Zhang He took advantage of Ma Su's mistake by striking at the Shu camp's water supply. Scattering Wang Ping's much smaller force, he succeeded in cutting off the enemy's water supply. The parched soldiers of Shu were easily defeated when Zhang He launched an offensive on the main camp itself. Wang Ping, with only a handful of soldiers, did his best to keep the retreat organized and ordered his soldiers to beat their drums loudly to create the impression that reinforcements had arrived. Zhang He believed this to be an ambush and did not pursue. When Zhuge Liang arrived, he could not force Zhang He from his position and retreated to Hanzhong.

Records on Ma Su's death

According to a record from the biography of Xiang Lang, it is stated that Xiang Lang, as a close friend of Ma Su, didn't report him when he fled though the record makes no statement if it was during or after the battle.

Though he survived the battle, Ma Su's army suffered a heavy defeat (Wang Ping was able to regroup the scattered forces), so he was soon arrested and sentenced to execution by a reluctant and tearful Zhuge Liang as a way to soothe the masses. Before his execution Ma Su wrote a letter to Zhuge Liang:  Many among the army wept greatly for Ma Su's death.

When Jiang Wan later visited Hanzhong, he spoke with Zhuge Liang on this matter: "In the past, when the kingdom of Chu killed Dechen (得臣) then the joy of the Duke Wen of Jin was great. Today, the Empire has yet to be unified, however you put a man of wise counsel to death. Is it not regretful?" Zhuge Liang, in tears, answered: "The reason why the kingdom of Sun Wu (孫武) was able to end the war through the empire was that he was clear in application of laws. Thus, it was because Yang Gan (楊干) had brought confusion to laws that Wei Jiang put his charioteer to death. Now that the 'four seas' are still divided and split and war has just begun. If we again abandon the laws, then by what means shall we quell the rebels?"

Xi Zuochi commented on this event and harshly criticized Zhuge Liang for Ma Su's death, he said: 

Li Sheng and Zhang Xiu were also put to death with Ma Su. Wang Ping, on the other hand, was promoted to General Who Attacks Bandits for his efforts in minimizing casualties and for trying to prevent Ma Su's actions. Zhuge Liang sent a memorial to the Emperor Liu Shan requesting to be demoted for the defeat at Jieting which he was.

Regardless, Ma Su was deemed by Zhuge Liang and later by Liu Shan in an imperial memorial following the Battle of Jianwei to hold major responsibility for the failure of the first Northern Expedition. However, Ma Su's wife and children were well taken care of by Zhuge Liang after Ma Su's death. Zhuge Liang also personally offered sacrifice at Ma Su's grave.

See also
 Lists of people of the Three Kingdoms

Notes

References

 
 
 
 Pei, Songzhi (5th century). Annotations to Records of the Three Kingdoms (Sanguozhi zhu).
 Sima Guang (11th century). Zizhi Tongjian (Comprehensive Mirror to Aid in Government).

190 births
228 deaths
Officials under Liu Bei
Shu Han generals
Shu Han politicians
Politicians from Xiangyang
Political office-holders in Sichuan
Executed Shu Han people
People executed by Shu Han
3rd-century executions
Executed people from Hubei
Generals from Hubei